The Corbetti Caldera is an actively deforming volcano in the Main Ethiopian Rift. It is the site of the Corbetti Geothermal Power Station. The Corbetti Caldera is 15km across and overlaps an older (pleistocene), 30km  by 40km caldera called Awasa, which is considered the same volcanic system. The Corbetti Caldera contains the central cone called Urji  and a large obsidian dome called Chebbi. The Awasa Caldera contains Lake Hawassa and the town of Awasa, the Corbetti caldera contains half of the Senkelle Swayne's Hartebeest Sanctuary.

References

Mountains of Ethiopia
Calderas of Ethiopia